General elections were due to be held in Sark on 14 December 2016. However, only 12 candidates were nominated for the 17 seats available in the Chief Pleas, meaning that all were elected unopposed for a four-year term, without a public vote being required.

A by-election was due to take place on 5 April in 2017 to fill the five vacant seats. Only one candidate, Pauline Margaret Mallinson, stood as a candidate in the by-election. She was declared duly elected unopposed, with a term to end in January 2021, and the remaining four seats were left vacant.

Results

References

Sark
2016 in Guernsey
Elections in Sark
Uncontested elections
Non-partisan elections
Sark